The International Federation for Equestrian Sports (FEI) is the international governing body of equestrian sports.

The FEI headquarters are in Lausanne, Switzerland. An FEI code of conduct protects the welfare of the horses from physical abuse or doping. On March 2, 2022, in the wake of the 2022 Russian invasion of Ukraine, the FEI banned Russian and Belarusian athletes, horses, and officials from FEI events, and subsequently an FEI Tribunal panel dismissed an appeal by Russia's Federation of Equestrian Sports challenging the ban.

Disciplines
The FEI recognizes eight disciplines under global governance in both regular and para-equestrianism competition: 
 Dressage
 Combined driving
 Endurance
 Eventing
 Para-equestrian
 Reining
 Show jumping
 Equestrian vaulting

The following two disciplines are under regional governance: 
 Horseball
 Tent pegging

The FEI does not govern or provide rules for horse racing or polo, but in the latter case, it has signed a Memorandum of Understanding with the Federation of International Polo.

Values

Vision
To grow the unique and mutually beneficial bond between horse and human in sport globally.

Mission
To drive and develop equestrian sport globally in a modern, sustainable and structured manner with guaranteed integrity, athlete welfare, equal opportunity and a fair and ethical partnership with the horse.

Events

Olympic and Paralympic Games

Jumping, Dressage and Eventing have been a part of the Olympics since 1912. Para-Equestrian Dressage has been part of the Paralympic games since 1996. Jumping has been part of the Youth Olympic Games since its creation in Singapore in 2010.

FEI World Equestrian Games
The FEI has organized the FEI World Equestrian Games every four years since 1990.  The idea of the World Equestrian Games (WEG) came into being in the mid-1980s and was strongly supported by HRH Prince Philip, who was then FEI President.

The WEG encompasses the World Championship titles in all the FEI global disciplines.

World Cup
The FEI World Cup is an indoor series and takes place throughout the world with qualifying leagues leading to a final in each of the disciplines.   The FEI World Cup series began with show jumping in 1978 and has since been extended to the disciplines of dressage, driving, and vaulting. Main events include:
Dressage World Cup
Show Jumping World Cup
World Cup Driving
World Cup Vaulting

World, continental and regional championships
FEI World, Continental and Regional Championships are held in all the FEI disciplines and age categories.  Events include:

 World Eventing Championships for Young Horses
 FEI World Driving Championships for Four-in-Hand
 FEI World Driving Championships for Singles
 FEI World Endurance Championships for Seniors
 FEI World Vaulting Championships for Seniors
 FEI World Para-Equestrian Driving Championships

European

 European Dressage Championships
 European Show Jumping Championships
 European Eventing Championships
 Equestrian at the Friendship Games
 Ljubičevo Equestrian Games
 2019 FEI European Championships
 2017 FEI European Championships
 2009 FEI European Championships
 2013 European Para-Dressage Championship

Asian

 Equestrian sports first time at the 9th Asian Games in 1982.
 Equestrian at the Asian Games
 First Asian Equestrian Championships in Pattaya (THA) 30 Nov to 8 Dec 2019

Ratings

History
The FEI was formed in 1921 with the joining of the national organizations of Belgium, Denmark, France, Italy, Japan, Norway, Sweden and the United States of America. Today, there are 136 National Equestrian Federations affiliated with the FEI.

On March 2, 2022, in the wake of the 2022 Russian invasion of Ukraine, the FEI banned Russian and Belarusian athletes, horses, and officials from FEI events, and subsequently an FEI Tribunal panel dismissed an appeal by Russia's Federation of Equestrian Sports challenging the ban.

Presidents

There have been 13 different presidents of the organization. Major Jhkr Karl F. Quarles van Ufford is the only individual to have served twice. Nowadays, a President can serve for a maximum of three terms. Since 2014, the President of the FEI is Ingmar De Vos from Belgium.

References

External links
 
FEI TV: Official Equestrian Sport streaming website
FEI Inside
FEI Database

 
Equestrian organizations
IOC-recognised international federations